Jalal (Arabic: جلال) is a masculine given or family name. The name or word Jalal means majesty and is used to honor and venerate.

When the Arabic language spread across non-Arabic regions, Jalal has also become a name for some Arabic-speaking Christians, non-Arab Muslims, and non-Arabs and has been added to other language dictionaries with the majestic meaning.

Another form is Galal, where the first letter "ج" is pronounced like hard g /g/ in English. Galal might have other meanings in different languages.

Examples 
The word Jalal could be found in many history, art, religious, and poetry books. For example: 

 Jalal is used as a characteristic when addressing royals like kings and lords in history, myth, and formal occasion. 
Jalál the second month and the Saturday as a first day of the week in the Bahá’í calendar. 
Religious books; 
In the Bible, Jalal is used as a veneration for God in Psalms (111:3), (145:5), etc., Isaiah (26:10), (30:30), etc., and the Great Doxology, written and read in Churches in Arabic. For example:
Psalm (111:3) (English, Arabic): ".جَلاَلٌ وَبَهَاءٌ عَمَلُهُ، وَعَدْلُهُ قَائِمٌ إِلَى الأَبَدِ"
Great Doxology (English, Arabic), second line: ".نشكرك من أجل عظيم جلال مجدك..."
In the word Aljalal, "ذو الجلال والإكرام", verses 27 and 78 of Surat al-Rahman in the Quran.

Given name 
Jalal Khoury (1933–2017), Lebanese playwright, theater director, comedian
Jalal Mansur Nuriddin (1944–2018), American poet
Jalal Merhi (born 1967), Canadian action film producer
Jalal Abdul Carim Sahib (1865–1939), Indian businessman
Jalal Agha (1945–1995), Indian actor and director
Jalal Akbari (born 1983), Iranian football player
Jalal al-Dawla (994–1044), Buyid amir of Iraq
Jalal Al-e-Ahmad (1923–1969), Iranian writer, thinker, and social and political critic
Jalal Hosseini (born 1982), Iranian football player
Jalal Pishvaian (1930–2021), Iranian actor
Jalal Talabani (1933-2017), Iraqi politician, president
Jalal Talebi (born 1942), Iranian football player and manager
Jalal Toufic (born 1962), Lebanese artist, filmmaker, and author 
Jalal-ud-din Muhammad Akbar (born 1542), Mughal sultan
Jalal Zolfonun (1937–2012), Iranian composer and setar player

Family name
 Ahmed Galal (born 1948), Egyptian economist 
 Ayesha Jalal (born 1956), Pakistani-American historian
 Aziza Jalal (born 1958), Moroccan Arabic pop singer
 Farida Jalal (born 1950), Persian actor
 Imrana Jalal, Indian-Fijian lawyer and activist
 Massouda Jalal (born 1964), Afghan politician
 Ramez Galal (born 1973), Egyptian comic, actor and singer
 Sayed Mahmood Jalal (born 1980), Bahraini footballer
 Shwan Jalal (born 1983), Iraqi-English football goalkeeper

Fictional people
Galal, main character of the Galal trilogy by Egyptian author Kamal Ruhayyim. 
Jalal Fernandes, an antagonist in the Fairy Tail series.

See also
 Jalil (disambiguation)

References 

Arabic-language surnames
Arabic masculine given names

de:Jalal